Staveley-in-Cartmel is a civil parish in the South Lakeland District of Cumbria, England. It contains 22 listed buildings that are recorded in the National Heritage List for England.  Of these, one is listed at Grade II*, the middle of the three grades, and the others are at Grade II, the lowest grade.  The parish is in the Lake District National Park.  It contains the villages of Staveley-in-Cartmel and Newby Bridge, and smaller settlements, but is mainly rural.  In the parish is Fell Foot Park, a country park on the shore of Windermere; four buildings in this park have been listed.  The other listed buildings include farmhouses, farm buildings, other houses, a milestone, a bridge, a church, and a sundial in the churchyard.


Key

Buildings

References

Citations

Sources

Lists of listed buildings in Cumbria
Listed buildings